In Innu mythology, Atshen is a cannibalistic spirit that hunts through the permafrost.

See also 
werewolf Wendigo

References 

Innu culture